Firefly is an ongoing line of comic books published by Boom! Studios from 2018. It is a canonical continuation of Joss Whedon's Firefly television series, the 2005 film Serenity, and Dark Horse Comics' Serenity comics, which are all part of the Firefly media franchise.

In mid-2018, Entertainment Weekly announced that Boom! Studios had assumed the Firefly license from Dark Horse Comics. Joss Whedon, creator of the original television series, will act as story consultant. Boom! Studios has also reprinted the Dark Horse stories in omnibus volumes.

Issues

Graphic novels

Collections

Reception

See also 
 List of comics based on television programs
 List of comics based on films

References

Comics based on television series
Comics based on films
Firefly (franchise) comics
Comics by Joss Whedon